Großkorbetha is a village and a former municipality in the Burgenlandkreis district, in Saxony-Anhalt, Germany. Since 1 September 2010, it is part of the town Weißenfels.

Historical Population 
Like many urban centres in the former East Germany, the population has declined since the Reunification of Germany.

Development of population (as of December 31 from 1995 on):

* 3 October (census)

References

Former municipalities in Saxony-Anhalt
Weißenfels